About You SE & Co. KG (stylized as ABOUT YOU) is a German fashion online retailer based in Hamburg. Founded in 2014 as a subsidiary of Otto Group, in 2018 its status changed to that of a portfolio company due to a shift in the shareholder balance.
Besides Germany, the retailer is active in 24 European countries. The private label Edited is also sold in traditional retail stores.

About You focuses primarily on personalization and influencer marketing. In 2018, the company was ranked as the fifth largest online fashion retailers in the country. It is also Hamburg's first non-listed digital startup company with a company valuation of more than one billion US dollars."

History
About You was launched in Germany on May 5, 2014. The company emerged from Collins (an allusion to American management expert Jim Collins and his book "Built to last"), an e-commerce project financed and overseen by the Otto Group, which invested a three-digit million amount in the project. Founders and managers were Benjamin Otto, Tarek Müller, Sebastian Betz und Hannes Wiese. Benjamin Otto ist the son of Otto Group chairman Michael Otto; he left Collins in 2015 to become managing partner at the Otto Group. Hannes Wiese was the former head of the Otto Group'''s strategy department, while Betz and Müller were independent entrepreneurs whose former companies were acquired by the Otto Group. Before starting Collins, Tarek Müller had already attained some prominence in Germany as a young serial entrepreneur, having developed his first income-generating website at the age of 13.About You webshops were launched in Austria and Switzerland (2015), the Netherlands and Belgium (2017), Poland and the Czech Republic (2018), Hungary, Slovakia and Romania (2019), Slovenia, Estonia, Latvia, Lithuania and Croatia (2020).

In 2016, the investment firms SevenVentures, a subsidiary of the German media company ProSiebenSat.1 Media, and German Media Pool bought a minority stake in the company. Three years after its founding, the investors valued About You at more than 300 million euros. In July 2018, the Danish company Heartland A/S, parent of the Bestseller clothing company, acquired a 29 % stake in About You. In this context, About You was valued at over one billion dollars, making the online retailer the first Hamburg-based unicorn. Otto, though still owning the largest share of the company, now held less than 50%, and About You was deconsolidated.

Since November 2017, About You has offered its e-commerce infrastructure (software for webshops), an in-house development, under the name "About You Cloud" as a licensed product to other online retailers.

 Expansion 
After starting in Germany, About You was exported to several European countries. They started with countries neighboring Germany and then exported to various countries in Europe. From 2017, the expansion was made to significantly more countries. It is available in 24 countries.

 Business and marketing specifics 
About You has implemented a cross-channel marketing approach with the smartphone app as its most important sales channel, generating 75 percent of the company's revenue. The About You shop currently (2020) offers more than 350,000 articles from over 1,500 brands. There have been a number of exclusive collection deals, e.g. a limited Disney collection and a Nike collection in 2019. The shop's target customer base are women and men between the ages of 18 and 49, but it has also started (in 2019) selling children's clothes.

The retailer's own brand Edited is sold via the webshop of the same name as well as in seven exclusive stores in Germany and Austria and by more than 100 retail partners in Germany, the Netherlands, Belgium, Switzerland, Austria, Denmark and the Czech Republic.

Influencer marketing
The company cooperates with more than 100 local influencers (2019), many of whom feature in themed photo collections on the shop's home page presenting fashion styles they have chosen from the shop's product range. Select influencers get to develop their own collections. Among the prominent cooperators are Stefanie Giesinger and Lena Gercke.

Personalization
About You's shop's logo changes from "About You" to "About <customer's name>" after login. The webshop and the app generate personalized feeds and tailored product suggestions for customers based on former purchases, likes of brands, people and product groups and purchase probabilities of people with similar profiles. In 2017, About You has been described as having "the technological edge in terms of personalization" over Zalando and other German online retailers.

Events and TV
Since 2017, About You organizes the About You Awards, a yearly award show that honors popular influencers. The show is broadcast on TV by ProSieben, Germany's second largest privately owned television network.

Starting on April 20, 2019, an afternoon TV-Show named "All About You – das Fashion Duell", with the company as official title sponsor, has run for ten episodes, also on ProSieben. It was succeeded by "Style your Star – It's About You", another sponsored afternoon format, running from June 29 till August 31, 2019.

In 2019, About You has also started a collaboration with the organizers of a beach music festival, Pangea, which was re-branded as the "About You Pangea Festival".

Awards
About You has been awarded the Internet World Business B2B trade journal's Shop Award for the best German online shops for four consecutive years from 2015 to 2018. In 2017, the company won the EHI Retail Institute's'' Retail Technology Award in the category "Best Customer Experience".

In 2019, the "About You Cloud" (the proprietary webshop infrastructure software that the company licenses to other online retailers) has received the "Deutscher Exzellenzpreis" ("German Excellence Award") in the category "Cloudservices".

References

External links
 About You Webshop Germany
 Edited Webshop Germany
 Company Website

Online clothing retailers of Germany
Companies based in Hamburg
Retail companies established in 2014
Internet properties established in 2014
German brands